Elliot Lurie (born August 19, 1948) is an American musician who was the lead guitarist, songwriter, and co-lead vocalist for the band Looking Glass from 1969 to 1974. He wrote and sang lead on their 1972 #1 hit single "Brandy (You're a Fine Girl)" and their 1973 Top 40 single "Jimmy Loves Mary-Anne".

Biography
After leaving the band in the mid-1970s, Lurie released a self-titled album and a single, "Disco (Where You Gonna Go)", both on Epic Records. Neither reached the Billboard Top 100. He later signed with Arista Records, and also worked writing songs for Chappell Music and Screen Gems Music.

In the 1980s, Lurie wrote and produced music for private business use. He moved to Los Angeles in 1984, and in 1985, became head of the music department at 20th Century Fox. That year, he produced the soundtrack album for the John Travolta and Jamie Lee Curtis film Perfect. Since then he has worked as music supervisor on numerous mainstream films, including Alien 3 (1992), A Night at the Roxbury (1998), Riding in Cars with Boys (2001), I Spy (2002) and Spanglish (2004).

In recent years, Lurie has returned to live performing.

References

External links

Elliot Lurie website https://elliotlurie.com/

1948 births
Living people
American male singer-songwriters
American singer-songwriters
American male guitarists
20th-century American guitarists
20th-century American male musicians